Elegant Soul is  an album by jazz group The Three Sounds featuring performances with an orchestra arranged by Monk Higgins recorded in 1968 and released on the Blue Note label.

Reception
The Allmusic review by Thom Jurek awarded the album 3½ stars stating "Elegant Soul was -- and could even be currently -- dismissed with a casual listen as lightweight pop with a compelling rhythmic sense. But that would be selling it way short. This album warrants close listening to discern all that's happening in its production and arrangements. Whether it's on the dancefloor, for sampling, for feel-good or deep listening, or for finger-popping, it satisfies on all levels".

Track listing
 "Elegant Soul" (Virginia P. Bland) - 3:15 
 "Do It Right Now" (Bland) - 6:20 
 "Sittin' Duck" (Monk Higgins) - 9:18 
 "(Sock It to Me) Harper Valley P.T.A." (Tom T. Hall) - 2:48 
 "Sugar Hill" (Dee Ervin, Miles Grayson) - 2:48 
 "African Sweets" (Ervin) - 4:30 
 "Black Gold" (Grayson) - 3:29 
 "Book of Slim" (Higgins) - 3:26 
 "Walls of Respect" (Gene Harris, Higgins) - 3:13 
Recorded at RPM Studios, Los Angeles, California on September 19 (tracks 3, 4 & 8) and September 20 (tracks 1, 2, 5-7 & 9), 1968

Personnel
Gene Harris - piano, organ
Andrew Simpkins - bass
Carl Burnett, Paul Humphrey - drums
Monk Higgins - arranger, conductor
Jim Horn - flute
Bob Jung - reeds
Dave Burk, Jesse Erlich, Henry Felber, Ron Fulsom, Louis Kievman, William Kurash, Leonard Malarsky, Ralph Schaeffer, Albert Steinberg, Tibor Zelig - violin
Phil Goldberg, Leonard Selic - viola
Jerry Kessler - cello
Alan Estes - vibes
Al Vescovo - guitar
Dee Ervin, Miles Grayson - percussion

References

Blue Note Records albums
The Three Sounds albums
1968 albums
Albums produced by Monk Higgins
Albums arranged by Monk Higgins
Albums conducted by Monk Higgins
Jazz-funk albums